Tamworth Correctional Centre, an Australian medium security prison for males, is located in Tamworth, New South Wales,  north of Sydney. The facility is operated by Corrective Services NSW, an agency of the Department of Attorney General and Justice, of the Government of New South Wales. The Centre accepts felons charged and convicted under New South Wales and/or Commonwealth legislation and serves as a reception prison for north–western New South Wales. A periodic detention centre for males was opened in March 1997.

History
The first records of correctional facilities being established in Tamworth was on 17 December 1864 when the Police Magistrate at Tamworth was appointed as the Visiting Justice at the Tawmorth Gaol. A gaoler and sheriff were appointed in 1868. At the commencement of 1920 there were 11 prisoners detained and during the year 201 prisoners were received, with 183 discharged leaving 29 in prison by 31 December 1920. Almost 20 per cent of the prisoners were aged under 21 years. The Tamworth Gaol closed on 25 March 1943.

Prior to its opening as an adult male correctional centre in 1991, the facility known variously as the Tamworth Institution for Boys, the Tamworth Boys’ Home, and Endeavour House, was a male juvenile justice centre that pre–dated the establishment of the Kariong Youth Correctional Centre which opened in September 1991.

See also

Punishment in Australia

References

External links
 Tamworth Correctional Centre webpage

Prisons in New South Wales
Buildings and structures in Tamworth, New South Wales